is a passenger railway station located in the city of Maibara, Shiga, Japan, operated by the West Japan Railway Company (JR West).

Lines

Station layout
The station consists of two opposed unnumbered side platforms connected by an underground passage. The station is unattended.

Platform

Adjacent stations

History
The station was closed on November 1, 1940 and reopened as "Sakata Station" on August 1, 1954 under the Japan National Railways (JNR) after World War II. The station came under the aegis of the West Japan Railway Company (JR West) on April 1, 1987 due to the privatization of JNR. The station was relocated 200 meters towards Maibara and the platforms lengthened in 1991.

Station numbering was introduced in March 2018 with Sakata being assigned station number JR-A11.

Passenger statistics
In fiscal 2019, the station was used by an average of 636 passengers daily (boarding passengers only).

Surrounding area
Maibara City Sakata Elementary School
Statue of Yamauchi Kazutoyo and his wife Chiyo (located in front of the station).

See also
List of railway stations in Japan

References

External links

JR West official home page

Railway stations in Shiga Prefecture
Railway stations in Japan opened in 1931
Hokuriku Main Line